Charley Tolar (September 5, 1937 – April 28, 2003) was an early American Football League (AFL) star who played his entire career with the Houston Oilers.

Biography
Tolar attended Northwestern State University of Louisiana.  At Northwestern, Tolar was twice Gulf States Conference MVP and still holds four school records.

One of the most popular figures in the early days of the AFL, the 5-6, 210-pounder had dozens of nicknames, including "the Human Bowling Ball", and was named to AFL All-Star teams in 1961, 1962 and 1963. Tolar helped the Houston Oilers win the first American Football League championship in 1960 and repeat in 1961.  The team finished as runners-up in 1962, when he was the team's Offensive MVP with 1,012 yards and a league record 244 carries. He finished his career with 3,277 rushing yards and 175 catches. He was named to the Oilers' 30th Anniversary Dream Team chosen by fans in 1989, and was among the top ten all-time rushers in the history of the AFL.

Charlie Tolar was also an oil well fire-fighter.  He worked for noted oil well fire-fighter Red Adair.

Tolar died in Houston in 2003 following a bout with cancer.

References 

American football running backs
Northwestern State Demons football players
Houston Oilers players
American Football League All-Star players
1937 births
2003 deaths
American Football League players